Choqa Naqd Ali (also Romanized as Choqā Naqd ‘Alī; and Chaqā Naqd-e ‘Alī; also known as Cheqā Kabūd, Cheqā Kabūd-e Naqd ‘Alī, Cheqā Naqd-e ‘Alī-ye ‘Olyā, Chia Kao, and Chīā Kū) is a village in Chaqa Narges Rural District, Mahidasht District, Kermanshah County, Kermanshah Province, Iran. At the 2006 census, its population was 159, in 39 families.

References 

Populated places in Kermanshah County